W Ursae Minoris is an eclipsing binary star system in the constellation Ursa Minor. Its apparent magnitude ranges from 8.51 to 9.59 over 1.7 days as one star passes in front of the other relative to observers on Earth. The combined spectrum of the system is A1/2V.

Models of their evolution and mass transfer suggest that the secondary star was initially the more massive of the two and that it has lost mass to what is now the primary as well as losing mass completely from the system. The two stars have also spiralled in towards each other over the few hundred million years since they formed.

References

Ursa Minor (constellation)
Eclipsing binaries
Ursae Minoris, W
150265
079069
A-type main-sequence stars
G-type subgiants